Guática is a town and municipality in the Risaralda Department of Colombia, at approximately 1530m above sea level. Founded in 1537 by Don Ruy de Vanegas, a lieutenant of Sebastián de Belalcázar and by the priest Esteban de Guevara. The town's name derives from Cacique Guática, supreme ruler of the Santa Maria Valley. To many the date of its foundation is considered to be March 8, 1627 realized by the disposition of Lesmes de Espinoza y Saravia, witness and representative of the Royal court of Spain.

Around 1860 the Antioquean conquistadores founded a new town that was later to be known as San Clemente, Risaralda.

In 1868 the caserío of Guática acquires the character of a corregimiento and becomes part of the District of Quinchía by the name of Nazareth. In 1892 the district of Nazareth is created having Guática as its capital. In 1905 the name of Nazareth was changed to San Clemente.

On April 22, 1921 Guática was proclaimed a municipio and San Clemente as its main town.

The cultural entities of Guática are The Cultural House of Guatica, The Cultural House of Santa Ana, The Community Center of San Clemente and the Lions Club. There are also Folkloric Dance groups, orquestras and music bands, a youth music band, and a great variety of local peasant musical groups.

For tourism and recreation. Guática has a beautiful botanical garden, a multisports center, activities  at the Guatica River, the Guillermo Medina Mesa Stadium, soccer and basketball courts in most of the villages of the municipio.

Its traditional celebrations include Guática's anniversary, traditional festivities patronizing the Virgen del Carmen, sugarcane festivities in Santa Ana and water festivities in San Clemente.

References

External links

 Guatica's official website (Spanish)

Populated places established in 1537
Municipalities of Risaralda Department
1537 establishments in the Spanish Empire